Devon Hodges (born 26 July 1984) is a Jamaican professional football player who plays as a striker for Molynes United in the top flight Jamaica National Premier League.

Club career

Wadadah 
He started his career with Wadadah in 2003.

Rivoli United 
But moved to Rivoli after teammate Dwight Heron convinced him to join him from Montego Bay to Spanish Town. After relegation to the second level in summer 2006, Hodges scored eight goals in six play-off matches at the end of the 2007/2008 season, with four coming in the last match as his team routed his former club Wadadah 11–0 to gain promotion back to the NPL.

In his first season back at the highest level, he immediately became top league goalscorer, scoring 24 goals in the 2008/2009 season to keep Rivoli up. Hodges has continued his goalscoring pace in the 2009/2010 season with 17 goals as on 5 May 2010.  Hodges finished the 2009/10 season with 18 goals in the DPL and finish as the joint leading goalscorer, unfortunately Rivoli United was relegated to the South Central Confederation Super League.

Tivoli Gardens 
On 2 September 2010, Hodges signed with a loan deal with Tivoli Gardens.

Sông Lam Nghệ An 
In January 2011, Hodges signed a six-month loan deal with Sông Lam Nghệ An

TDCS Dong Thap F.C. 

In 2012, Hodges signed with TDCS Dong Thap F.C. for the 2012 V-league season.

Rivoli United 
Hodges returned to Rivoli United in 2013 and led them to the Super League title and a return to the NPL.

Mount Pleasant Football Academy 
In 2017, Hodges joined Mount Pleasant F.A. and led them to the RSPL.

Molynes United
Hodges joined newly promoted Molynes United in 2019, scoring its inaugural Jamaica National Premier League goal.

International career
He made his debut for Jamaica in a May 2009 friendly match against El Salvador and scored his first international goal in his second match against Panama.

International goals
Scores and results list Jamaica's goal tally first.

Achievements 

Rivoli United
South Central Confederation Super League: 1
 2007/2008

Sông Lam Nghệ An
V-League: 1
 2011

Mount Pleasant Football Academy
Eastern Confederation Super League: 1
 2017/2018

NPL records
Hodges gained local fame by setting the record for most goals scored in a single National Premier League (NPL) game, when he scored 10 during Rivoli's 15–0 trashing (which is also a record) of Invaders in the 2004/2005 season.

References

1984 births
Living people
People from Saint Ann Parish
Jamaican expatriate sportspeople in Vietnam
Jamaican footballers
Jamaican expatriate footballers
Rivoli United F.C. players
Wadadah F.C. players
Expatriate footballers in Vietnam
Tivoli Gardens F.C. players
Dong Thap FC players
National Premier League players
Association football forwards
Mount Pleasant Football Academy players
Jamaica international footballers